Ancient Belgian is a hypothetical extinct Indo-European language, spoken in Belgica (northern Gaul) in late prehistory. It is often identified with the hypothetical Nordwestblock. While it remains a matter of controversy, the linguist Maurits Gysseling, who attributed the term to SJ De Laet, hypothesised a Belgian that was distinct from the later Celtic and Germanic languages. According to the theory, which was further elaborated by Hans Kuhn and others, traces of Belgian can be found in certain toponyms such as South-East-Flemish Bevere, Eine, Mater and Melden.

Overview 
The borders of the Belgian Sprachraum are made up by the Canche and the Authie in the south-west, the Weser and the Aller in the east, and the Ardennes and the German Mittelgebirge in the south-east. It has been hypothetically associated with the Nordwestblock, more specifically with the Hilversum culture.

The use of the name Belgian for the language is to some extent supported by Julius Caesar's De Bello Gallico. He mentions that the Belgae and the Galli spoke different languages. It is furthermore supported by toponyms in present-day Belgium, which, according to Kuhn, point at the existence of an Indo-European language, distinct from Celtic and Germanic languages. Hans Kuhn also noted certain connections (suffixes, ethnonyms, toponyms, anthroponyms) between this language and the Indo-European languages of southern Europe, in particular with the Italic languages. Before their migration to the south, the Italics must have resided in central Europe, in the vicinity of the Germans and the Slavs, as shown by the large vocabulary common to these groups. Some of them may have migrated to the northwest, while the others headed for the Italian peninsula, hence the connection that has been made between the Umbrians and the Ambrones of the shores of the North Sea.

Proponents of the Belgian language hypothesis also suggest that it was influenced by Germanic languages during a first, early Germanicisation in the 3rd century BC, as distinct from the Frankish colonization in the 5th to the 8th centuries AD. For example, the Germanic sound shifts (p → f, t → th, k → h, ŏ → ă) have affected toponyms that supposedly have a Belgian-language origin. 

Characteristics of Belgian are said to include the retention of p after the sound shifts, a trait that it shared with the Lusitanian language. Names of bodies of water ending in -ara, as in the name for the Dender; -ănā or -ŏnā, as in Matrŏnā (Marne River and also the current Mater) and settlement names ending in -iŏm are supposedly typically Belgian as well.

According to Gysseling, traces of Belgian are still visible. The diminutive suffix -ika, the feminizing suffixes -agjōn and -astrjō and the collective suffix -itja have been incorporated in Dutch, sometimes very productively. In toponymy, apa, poel, broek, gaver, drecht, laar and ham are retained as Belgian loanwords.

See also 
 Germanic substrate hypothesis

References

Sources 
 M. Gysseling, "Enkele Belgische leenwoorden in de toponymie", in Naamkunde 7 (1975), pp. 1–6. 
 J. Molemans, "Profiel van de Kempische toponymie", in Naamkunde 9 (1977), pp. 1–50. 

Unclassified Indo-European languages
Extinct languages of Europe
Linguistic strata